The 1937 Duke Blue Devils football team was an American football team that represented Duke University as a member of the Southern Conference during the 1937 college football season. In its seventh season under head coach Wallace Wade, the team compiled a 7–2–1 record (5–1 against conference opponents), was ranked No. 20 in the final AP Poll, and outscored opponents by a total of 228 to 56.  Woodrow Lipscomb was the team captain. The team played its home games at Duke Stadium in Durham, North Carolina.

Schedule

References

Duke
Duke Blue Devils football seasons
Duke Blue Devils football